Agromyces flavus is a Gram-negative, aerobic and non-motile bacterium from the genus of Agromyces which has been isolated from soil from the Tibetan Plateau in China.

References 

Microbacteriaceae
Bacteria described in 2011